Manuel Jesús Ortiz Toribio (born 22 August 1984), known as Lolo, is a Spanish former professional footballer. A versatile defensive unit, he could play as both a central defender or defensive midfielder.

Club career
Born in Huelva, Lolo was a product of Sevilla FC's youth system. In the 2002–03 season he started playing as a senior with their reserves in the Segunda División B, scoring a decisive goal against Burgos CF which led to a promotion to Segunda División in 2007.

Lolo made his La Liga debut the following campaign, appearing in two matches in March 2008, the first being on the 1st in a 2–1 away loss to Deportivo de La Coruña. Earlier, in December, he had made his first appearance in the UEFA Champions League, playing the entire match in a 3–0 group stage victory at SK Slavia Prague. However, he spent the majority of the season with the reserves, being a defensive stalwart for the Andalusians whom retained their league status.

Lolo was loaned to neighbours Málaga CF for 2008–09, spending most of the season as defensive midfielder and scoring home deciders against Real Valladolid (2–1) and Sporting de Gijón (1–0). In October 2009, already established in Sevilla's first team, he signed a new contract until June 2011. He scored his first goal as a Sevillista on 10 April 2010, in the 84th minute of a 2–1 win at former club Málaga.

After being deemed surplus to requirements at Sevilla, Lolo joined fellow top-flight side CA Osasuna on a four-year deal, in late August 2010. In his debut campaign, in which the Navarrese narrowly avoided relegation, he was used mainly as a central defender while also starting regularly, and also contributed goals against Hércules CF (3–0, at home) and RCD Espanyol (4–0, also at home).

On 19 January 2018, after stints in his country with Real Zaragoza and Elche CF (second tier) and Hércules (third), 33-year-old Lolo moved abroad for the first time in his career with Indian Super League club FC Pune City. He retired later that year.

In 2021, Lolo joined Bodø-based IK Junkeren's coaching staff, with his compatriot José Isidoro being in charge of the academy and his wife Tamara Carrillo also working there.

Career statistics

Honours
Sevilla B
Segunda División B: 2006–07

Sevilla
Copa del Rey: 2009–10

References

External links

1984 births
Living people
Spanish footballers
Footballers from Huelva
Association football defenders
Association football midfielders
Association football utility players
La Liga players
Segunda División players
Segunda División B players
Sevilla Atlético players
Sevilla FC players
Málaga CF players
CA Osasuna players
Real Zaragoza players
Elche CF players
Hércules CF players
Indian Super League players
FC Pune City players
Spanish expatriate footballers
Expatriate footballers in India
Spanish expatriate sportspeople in India
Spanish expatriate sportspeople in Norway